Gilli Danda (also spelled Gulli-Danda) also known as Viti Dandu, Kitti-Pul  and by other variations, is a sport originating from the Indian subcontinent, played in the rural areas and small towns all over South Asia as well as Cambodia, Iran, Turkey, South Africa, Italy, Poland, and in some Caribbean islands like Cuba. The game is played with two sticks: a large one called a danda (Dandi in Nepali, Dandu/दांडू/ದಾಂಡು in Marathi, Kittipul/கிட்டிப்புள்  in Tamil and Kannada, കോൽ in Malayalam), which is used to hit a smaller one, the gilli (Biyo in Nepali, Viti/विटी in Marathi, kittikol/ கிட்டிக்கோல்   in Tamil and Chinni/ಚಿನ್ನಿ in Kannada, കുറ്റി in Malayalam).  Other than using a smaller target stick, rather than a ball, it bears many similarities to bat and ball games such as cricket and baseball.

Gullidanda is an ancient sport, possibly with origins over 2500 years ago.

Etymology
Gillidanda  is derived from ghaṭikā [ghaṭ a+ka], literally "tip-cat". An explanatory definition is given in the commentary as ghaṭikā is "a game played using two sticks: one long and the other short. It is played by hitting the shorter stick with the longer one." Ghaṭikā is still known to countries from the Indian subcontinent and south Asian countries like Bangladesh and India. In Bangladesh, it is known as ḍāṅguli khelā; while in Nepali, it is known as Dandi-Biyo (डण्डी बियो), which is a similar game. There are certain rules for preparing the sticks and playing the game with them.

Gillidanda is known by various other names: it is called Tipcat in English, Iti-Dakar (اٽي ڏڪر) in Sindhi, guli-badi (ଗୁଲି ବାଡ଼ି) in Odia (regional variations dabalapua ଡାବଲପୁଆ and ପିଲବାଡ଼ି pilabadi in Phulbani and guti-dabula ଗୁଟିଡାବୁଳ in Balasore), gulli-ṭāṇ (𑂏𑂳𑂪𑂹𑂪𑂲 𑂗𑂰𑂝) in Bhojpuri, alak-doulak (الک دولک) in Persian, dānggűli (ডাঙ্গুলি) in Bengali, Tang Guti (টাং গুটি) in Assamese, chinni-kolu ಚಿನ್ನಿ ಕೋಲು in Kannada, kuttiyum kolum in Malayalam, vitti-dandu विट्टी दांडू in Marathi, Koyando-bal(कोयंडो बाल) in Konkani, kitti-pul (கிட்டி-புல்) in Tamil, Gooti-Billa (Andhra Pradesh) or Karra-Billa (Andhra Pradesh) or Billam-Godu (Andhra Pradesh) or chirra-gonay (in Telangana) in Telugu, Gulli-Danda (/ਗੁੱਲ਼ੀ ਡੰਡਾ) in Punjabi, Geeti Danna in Saraiki, Ampra kaakay(am pra ka kay) in Pashto, Kon ko in Cambodian, Pathel Lele in Indonesian, syatong in Tagalog,  in Ilonggo, çelikçomak in Turkish,  in Zomi language, "Đánh Trỏng" or "Đánh Khăng" in Vietnam, Quimbumbia in Cuba and Lippa in Italy.

Rules

"Gillidanda" is played with two pieces of equipment – a danda, being a long wooden stick, and a gilli, a small oval-shaped piece of wood. It is played with four or more players of even numbers.
Standing in a small circle, the player balances the gilli on a stone in an inclined manner (somewhat like a see-saw) with one end of the gilli touching the ground while the other end is in the air. The player then uses the danda to hit the gilli at the raised end, which flips it into the air. While it is in the air, the player strikes the gilli, hitting it as far as possible. Having struck the gilli, the player is required to run and touch a pre-agreed point outside the circle before the gilli is retrieved by an opponent. There are no specific dimensions of gillidanda and it does not have a limited number of players.

The gilli becomes airborne after it is struck. If a fielder from the opposing team catches the gilli, the striker is out. If the gilli lands on the ground, the fielder closest to the gilli has one chance to hit the danda (which has to be placed on top of the circle used) with a throw (similar to a run out in cricket). If the fielder is successful, the striker is out; if not, the striker scores one point and gets another opportunity to strike. The team (or individual) with the most points wins the game. If the striker fails to hit the gilli in three tries, the striker is out (similar to a strikeout in baseball). After the gilli has been struck, the opposing players need to return to the circle or, in the best case, catch it in mid-air without it hitting the ground – this was believed to have later evolved into a Catch Out in cricket and baseball.

Variations
As an amateur youth sport, gilli danda has many regional variations. In some versions, the number of points a striker score depends on the distance the gilli falls from the striking point. The distance is measured in terms of the length of the danda, or in some cases the length of the gilli. Scoring also depends on how many times the gilli was hit in the air in one strike. If it travels a certain distance with two mid-air strikes, the total points are doubled. If the gilli is not struck far enough the player has to pick it up and try again.
Shobhit Maurya is a world champion of gilli danda at present with several world records in his name. The UNESCO Advisory committee and the International Council of Traditional Sports and Games (ICTSG) are keen to revive and promote all such traditional sports which are almost dying in the World.

Similar games 

 In Iran, a similar game is called “Alak dolak (الک دلک)” and “Aluch Aghach (ألوچ آقاچ)” by Persians and Turks, respectively.
 In Azerbaijan, a similar game is called Çilingağac (Chilingaghaj).
 In Galicia, a similar game is called billarda.
 In Catalonia and the Valencian Community, a similar game is called bòlit.
 In Philippines, a game known as syatong or pati-kubra (in Morong, Rizal) is similar to gilli-danda.
 In Italy a similar game known as "Lippa", "Lipe", "Tirolo", or "S-cianco" is shown in the movie Watch Out, We're Mad!.
 In the United States, a similar game is called pee-wee.
 Dainty is a street ball game played in Schnitzelburg, Louisville, in the United States
 In England, a similar game was called Tip-cat, giddy-gaddy and cat's pallet.
 In Poland a similar game is known, called Klipa
 In Malaysia a similar game is known as konda kondi
 In Russia a similar game is known as chizhik (чижик)
 In Ukraine a similar game is known as chizhik (чижик) as well with sports colours being black
 In Slovenia a similar game is known as pandolo
 In Mexico the game is known as Shangai or Changarais
In Cuba the game is known as Quimbumbia.
 In Newfoundland a similar traditional children's game is known as Tiddly or Piddly.
 In Ireland a variation of the game is called Cead (pronounced "Kyad"), and is traditionally played exclusively on one day a year, St. Patrick's Day (17th March), on the island of Inishmaan (Inis Meáin) on the Atlantic coastline of Galway.

In popular culture 
In 2014 Vitti Dandu, a sport-drama Marathi movie, was made on the same sport, produced by Ajay Devgan and Leena Deore.

The Bollywood movie Lagaan mentions the traditional youth sport of gilli-danda as being similar to cricket.

The Hindi writer Premchand wrote a short story named "Gilli-danda" in which he compares old simple times and emotions to modern values and also hints at caste inequalities in India. The protagonist and narrator of the story recounts his inability to play gilli-danda well in his youth. He remembers a friend who could control the gilli as he wished. He goes away and comes back as an adult and a government officer. He searches for his old friend and finds him – he is very poor and says "Where do we get the time?" when asked by the protagonist whether he plays gilli-danda. The protagonist convinces him to play – he cheats at every opportunity, but his friend meekly submits, even though he would not have let him get away with such deceit in his youth. After being defeated, the friend invites him to a gilli-danda match the next day. The protagonist is shocked when he sees his friend play just as well as before and realises that he had indulged him because he knew that he had forgotten the basics of gilli-danda. The protagonist feels very small and goes back to the city humiliated.

The 1934 Laurel & Hardy film Babes in Toyland features Laurel playing the US version of the game, which he refers to as "Pee Wee."

See also
Backyard cricket
Pittu Garam, also known as Pithu Fod or simply Pithu
Kho Kho
Paandi

References

External links
 How to Play Gilli-Danda
SEVEN GAMES OF INDIA IN THE 6TH CENTURY B.C.
 Watch Gilli-danda being played
 Watch a Gilli-danda tournament
 Lippa 
 S-cianco 
 Gilli Danda International Federation 

Traditional sports of India
Indian games
Sports originating in South Asia
Sports originating in India